Valery Dudin (born August 20, 1963) was a Soviet luger who competed during the 1980s. He earned the bronze medal in the men's singles event at the 1984 Winter Olympics in Sarajevo. He also competed at the 1988 Winter Olympics.

References

External links
DatabaseOlympics.com profile on Dudin.
Fuzilogik Sports - Winter Olympic results - Men's luge
Hickoksports.com results on luge and skeleton.

1963 births
Living people
Lugers at the 1984 Winter Olympics
Lugers at the 1988 Winter Olympics
Russian male lugers
Soviet male lugers
Olympic lugers of the Soviet Union
Olympic medalists in luge
Medalists at the 1984 Winter Olympics
Olympic bronze medalists for the Soviet Union